= Bloomingdale Road =

Bloomingdale Road may refer to:

- Bloomingdale Road (Staten Island), a road in Staten Island, New York
- A former name of part of Broadway (Manhattan)
